Emperor Chu (出帝; Chudi) may refer to:

Emperor Xiaowu of Northern Wei (510–535), also known as Emperor Chu of Northern Wei
Shi Chonggui (914–974, reigned 942–946), Emperor Chu of Later Jin, during the Five Dynasties and Ten Kingdoms period